Peter McIntyre's River Residence (1955) is one of the famous Australian architect's most notable designs. Built during a Post-World-War Two period that was defined architecturally by the International Style, it stands as a testament to the architectural whims and intentions of Melbourne in the 1950s. The McIntyre River Residence quintessentially embodies Peter McIntyre's striking style as well as the Post-War Melbourne Regional style. The June 1956 issue of Vogue in the US commented that the house was "like some exotic bird of paradise perched high on the densely wooded bank."

Location
The McIntyre River Residence is located at 2 Hodgson Street in Kew, Victoria, Australia approximately 4 km from the Melbourne CBD. The property had a high propensity for flooding from the Yarra River to the south of the site, and this, combined with plans at the time to extend a boulevard road directly through the site, meant that McIntyre only had to pay £200 for the  property. He was 19 years old when he purchased the land in 1947. Soon after he bought the land, the plans for the boulevard had been scrapped. The  property featured a variety of landforms. A steep cliff in the middle of the south side of the property, a river that formed the title boundary along the entire south side of the site, and a general smattering of trees and thick scrub across the whole property all made for what McIntyre thought of as "a bit of a paradise".

Appearance
Given the difficult terrain and the consequently limited means of construction that could be employed, it is no surprise that the McIntyre River Residence is a largely extruded, removed form, from the surface of the ground. McIntyre chose to have his house "stand" on the site. This would reduce the amount of excavation and alteration to the site's natural contours and ultimately reduce the cost of the project.

With the knowledge that he had to cantilever his house in some way and that he would be limited in his materials and constructional methods, McIntyre designed a rigidly geometric house that featured shallow triangular living quarters perched atop a far more vertically elongated triangle that formed the access stairwell. The house was thus cantilevered either side of the "access" triangle.

Given that the house is accessed from below and that the individual enters the house in the middle, the dimensions and features within the residence are mirrored either side of the cantilever point.

Inside, the house featured a number of small facilities and an extraordinarily garish palette. Tomato red, hortensia, white, black and yellow paint covered the strawboard panels that clad the house. An enormous amount of light filled the house, a result of the numerous skylights that punctuated the inclined roof. Internally, the steel framing of the house and the rafters and joists were all exposed. This was a trait of the Melbourne Regional Style of the 1940s and 1950s. A balcony was located at either end of the house, at the height of the canopy of trees that hugged their way around the house. In essence, the McIntyre River Residence is a combination of basic geometric shapes. Two triangular prisms form the striking elevation of the design and the rectangular plan of the house. Access to the house is afforded by a cylindrical staircase that pushes up through the triangular prism that balances the extents of the house either side of it. Colour and carefully placed windows then afford the house a definitively organic quality.

Style
After World War Two, the International Style began sweeping the world and Melbourne with increasing fervor and interest. However, following the publication of Robin Boyd's Victorian Modern (1947), a new style began to emerge. It was an adaptation and appropriation of the International Style, so that it would be suited to Melbourne's people, climate and living styles. This was the Melbourne Regional Style. Most commonly found in domestic buildings, it inspired and provoked many architects who lived and worked in Australia's capital cities. Peter McIntyre was one such architect who was inspired and decided to design a house for himself and his wife in this new style. To Boyd, the style was simple, light, fresh and unpretentious; it was modernism for the masses. A simple, succinct and clear design was the ambition, and simple materials and colours were championed. The elongated rectangle that is the McIntyre River Residence's plan is in keeping with the narrow, linear plans that defined the Melbourne Regional Style. The large glassed areas that are rhythmically articulated by timber mullions evenly spaced throughout the house are also testament to the typical features of the style. Finally, a clear receptibility to the land and vegetation that surround the site typifies the Melbourne Regional Style's influence in the McIntyre River Residence and the house's strong link with the Australian climate and Australia's outdoor lifestyle.

Gallery

References

https://web.archive.org/web/20120322031436/http://users.tce.rmit.edu.au/e03159/ModMelb/mm2/modmelbprac2/pm/pmk/pmk.htm
Apperly, Richard (1994). "A Pictorial Guide to Identifying Australian Architecture Styles and Terms from 1788 to the present". Harper Collins Publishers. 

Houses in Victoria (Australia)
Buildings and structures in the City of Boroondara
Houses completed in 1955
1955 establishments in Australia
Modernist architecture in Australia